Vishnu Malla (Nepali: बिष्णु मल्ल) was a Malla dynasty king and the King of Patan. He succeeded Yoga Prakash Malla and reigned from 1729 until his death in 1745.

Ancestry 
Vishnu Malla traced his lineage from Srinivasa Malla. Srinivasa Malla had a daughter named Manimati. Manimati's children were Indra Malla, and Punyamati. Punyamati married Darasimha and they were the parents of Vishnu Malla.

Reign 
He strengthened his political powers by marrying Chandralakshmi, daughter of Jagajjaya Malla, the King of Kantipur. Kantipur and Patan once jointly invaded Bhadgaon and occupied some areas around Sanga which Bhadgaon later re-acquired with the help of Tanahun. It was during the time of Vishnu Malla that Gorkha and Tanahun started intervening in the politics of Kathmandu Valley and would end after being annexed by Prithvi Narayan Shah, king of Gorkha.

He built and renovated several religious monuments. He also frequently donated generous grants to temples and guthis.

Succession 
Vishnu Malla did not have any children and had adopted his wife's brother Rajya Prakash Malla as his successor. Rajya Prakash succeeded Vishnu Malla after the latter's death in 1745.

References

Notes

Sources 

18th-century Nepalese people
Nepalese monarchs
1745 deaths